Tough All Over is the sixth studio album by American country music artist Gary Allan. It was released in October 2005 via MCA Nashville. It has been certified gold by the RIAA. Recorded after his wife's suicide, this album is more somber than his previous ones, with several of its songs termed to be "excruciatingly sad."

Two songs from the album were released as singles: "Best I Ever Had" (a cover of a 2001 Vertical Horizon song) and "Life Ain't Always Beautiful" . Both placed reached within the Top 10 on the U.S. Billboard Hot Country Songs chart.

Critical Acclaim
Rhapsody ranked the album number 7 on its "Country's Best Albums of the Decade" list. "Allan's sixth album was the first one released after his wife of three years committed suicide. This collection of haunting, heartbreaking songs chronicles his pain and, ultimately, his path back to living. Steeped in grief, Tough All Over is one of Allan's most consistent efforts to date, thanks in part to his gift of conveying emotions like regret, heartbreak and emptiness in a single, well-phrased line. Country Universe said the album was the 3rd best of the decade. Engine 145 country music blog list it number 7 on the "Top Country Albums of the Decade" list.

Track listing

Personnel
As listed in liner notes.
Gary Allan - lead vocals
David Campbell - string arrangements on track 7
Perry Coleman - background vocals
Chad Cromwell - drums
Eric Darken - percussion
Kenny Greenberg - acoustic guitar on track 2, electric guitar on tracks 2, 7, 8 and 12
Wes Hightower - background vocals
Kirk "Jelly Roll" Johnson - harmonica on tracks 1 & 7
Jake Kelly - acoustic guitar
Steve Nathan - B3 organ, synthesizer, piano
Michael Rhodes - bass guitar
Brent Rowan - electric guitar
John Wesley Ryles - background vocals
Hank Singer - fiddle
Russell Terrell - background vocals
Robby Turner - steel guitar
John Willis - acoustic guitar
Reese Wynans - B3 organ on tracks 3 and 10

Strings by the Nashville String Machine.

Charts

Weekly charts

Year-end charts

Certifications

References

2005 albums
Gary Allan albums
MCA Records albums
Albums produced by Mark Wright (record producer)